Angélica Rivera Hurtado (born 2 August 1969) is a Mexican singer, model and telenovela actress who, as the wife of Former President Enrique Peña Nieto, was the First Lady of Mexico from 2012 to 2018.

Rivera's work as an actress has included Alcanzar una estrella II (1991), La Dueña (1995), Ángela (1998), Sin Pecado Concebido (2001), Mariana de la Noche (2003) and Tequila De Maguey (2007), as well as the soap opera Destilando Amor (2007), responsible for her current nickname "La Gaviota" (English: The Seagull). As a singer she was a member of the short-lived fictional teen group Muñecos de Papel.

Early life
Rivera was born in the neighborhood of Azcapotzalco, Mexico City and she is the daughter of Manuel Rivera Ruiz, a doctor, and María Eugenia Hurtado Escalante. She has five sisters and a brother. When actress Verónica Castro was filming near where Rivera lived as a young woman, they met and Castro suggested her to compete in "The Face of the Herald", a contest Rivera won in 1987.

Career

Early acting and modeling
Rivera’s career began at the age of 17, when she won The Face of the Herald contest. She was a model in the video Ahora Te Puedes Marchar with Luis Miguel. She then filmed two TV and radio commercials, one for the United States and one for Japan, followed by the TNT video program hosted by Martha Aguayo.

In 1989, Rivera received the opportunity to play a small part in the soap opera Dulce Desafío. This part was followed by many others on shows such as Simplemente Maria, Mi Pequeña Soledad and La Picara Soñadora. In 1991 Rivera was selected to play the scheming and opportunistic Silvana in Alcanzar una estrella II. In 1995, Rivera was chosen to give life to Regina Villarreal in La Dueña; alongside Francisco Gattorno. In 2003 she played a villain Marcia in the soap opera Mariana de la Noche, produced by Salvador Mejía.

In 2007, Rivera had the lead role in the successful and popular novela Destilando amor as Gaviota, a young girl from the country who went to the big city to look for a better life. As a result of her work on this soap, Rivera is frequently referred to in popular media as "La Gaviota".

First Lady of Mexico

As the wife of Enrique Peña Nieto, who was elected President of Mexico from December 2012 through December 2018, Rivera was the First Lady of Mexico. She has also, from March 2013, been President of the Sistema Nacional para el Desarrollo Integral de la Familia, the National System for Integral Family Development, a public institution for the welfare of families in Mexico. In February 2018, she opened the Comprehensive Care Center for Hearing Impairment, EnSeas, which would offer care to 70,000 people annually.

House scandal
On 9 November 2014, Aristegui Noticias published an article which revealed that a $7 million house in Lomas de Chapultepec owned by Rivera was registered under the name of a company affiliated with a business group that had received government contracts. The revelation about the potential conflict of interest in the acquisition of the house aggravated discontent during the Peña Nieto administration. Days later, Rivera released a video where she detailed her income as a former soap opera actress, stating that she was selling the house and that the property was not under her name because she had not made the full payment yet. The apology was poorly received and became widely criticized across social media. After the incident, Rivera diminished her public profile.

Personal life 

On 11 December 1994, Rivera was married to producer José Alberto Castro, brother of Verónica Castro, with whom she has three daughters: Angélica Sofía (born 1996), Fernanda (born 1999) and Regina (born 2005). The couple divorced in 2008 and the marriage was annulled by the Catholic Church.

Rivera married Enrique Peña Nieto, then Governor of the State of Mexico, on 27 November 2010. Days later, she announced her retirement of her artistic career to focus on "this great responsibility by his side, dedicated to my home, to my children". From this marriage, she has three stepchildren.

On 30 March 2012, Peña Nieto began his campaign for the presidency, and Rivera accompanied him to the events across the country. She also published a series of videos which she called "What my eyes see, what my heart feels", where she documented the campaign from her point of view.

On 8 February 2019, she announced on social media that she was divorcing Peña Nieto.

Filmography

Films

Television

Honours
 :
 Dame Grand Cross of the Order of the Dannebrog
 :
 Grand Cross of the Order of Prince Henry
 :
 Grand Cross of the Order of Charles III
 Dame Grand Cross of the Order of Isabella the Catholic

See also

List of first ladies of Mexico 
List of heads of state of Mexico 
History of Mexico
Politics of Mexico

References

External links 

1969 births
Living people
First ladies of Mexico
First ladies and gentlemen of the State of Mexico
Mexican child actresses
Mexican telenovela actresses
Mexican television actresses
Mexican film actresses
Mexican women singers
Actresses from Mexico City
Singers from Mexico City
20th-century Mexican actresses
21st-century Mexican actresses
People from Mexico City
Recipients of the Order of Isabella the Catholic
Dames Grand Cross of the Order of Isabella the Catholic
Mexican female models